Karolína Plíšková and Barbora Strýcová were the defending champions, but Plíšková chose not to participate this year. Strýcová played alongside Lucie Šafářová, but the team withdrew before their quarterfinal match.

Ashleigh Barty and Casey Dellacqua won the title, defeating Chan Hao-ching and Zhang Shuai in the final, 6–1, 2–6, [10–8].

Seeds

Draw

Draw

References
 Main Draw

Aegon Classicandnbsp;- Doubles
Doubles